Church of Luther, or Torņakalns Church after its geographical location in Torņakalns, is a Lutheran church in Riga, the capital of Latvia. It is a parish church of the Evangelical Lutheran Church of Latvia. The church is situated at the address 3/5 Torņakalns Street.

It is built in the traditional neo-gothic architectural style, with soaring arches, a tall spire, and a traditional cruciform shape. It is noted for its massive iron chandeliers.

References 

Churches in Riga
Lutheran churches in Latvia